Warren Edward "Tex" Tilson (June 8, 1902 –March 3, 1984) was an American college football player and coach for the Washington and Lee Generals. He was the brother of Sumner D. Tilson. He was captain of the 1924 football team, and also wrestled. As a coach, he led 1934 Washington and Lee Generals football team to the Southern Conference championship. Tilson also founded the Rockbridge fox hunt.

Head coaching record

References

External links
 

1902 births
1984 deaths
American football tackles
Duke Blue Devils football coaches
Washington and Lee Generals football coaches
Washington and Lee Generals football players
Washington and Lee Generals wrestlers
Players of American football from Texas
People from Motley County, Texas